Chelsea was an early 1970s band from New York City, best known for having future Kiss drummer Peter Criss before he joined in 1973. They released one album, the self-titled album Chelsea, in 1970. Shortly after recording their, unreleased, second studio album the band broke up.

In August 1971, the band became LIPS. A trio consisting of Criss and his Chelsea bandmates Michael Benvenga and Stan Penridge. 

By the spring of 1972, LIPS was just the duo of Criss and Penridge. They eventually disbanded completely.

Their sound has been compared to the Moody Blues, Procol Harum, and The Raisins, with whom Criss recorded as a guest musician in 1968.

In 1973, Pete Shepley and Mike Brand recorded an unreleased album which included post-Chelsea Michael Benvenga, a pre-Kiss Peter Criss, and on two songs Gene Simmons as session musicians.
It was titled Captain Sanity.

Chelsea

Chelsea is the only album released by the band. Peter Criss is credited as Peter Cris in the liner notes.

Track listing
"Rollin' Along" (Shepley, Brand) – 2:34
"Let's Call It a Day" (Shepley, Brand) – 3:05
"Silver Lining" (Aridas, Benvenga) – 2:49
"All American Boy" (Shepley, Brand) – 3:55
"Hard Rock Music" (Shepley, Brand) – 5:10
"Ophelia" (Shepley, Brand) – 2:38
"Long River" (Shepley, Brand) – 6:41
"Grace" (Shepley, Brand) – 3:17
"Polly Von" (Aridas, Benvenga, Brand, Cris, Shepley) – 5:01
"Good Company" (Shepley, Brand) – 1:44

Personnel
Peter Shepley – lead vocals
Mike Brand – guitar
Chris Aridas – guitar
Michael Benvenga – bass, vocals
Peter Criss – drums
John Cale – viola on track 7 and 10
Steve Loeb – piano on track 8

See also
Wicked Lester, another pre-Kiss band featuring the future Gene Simmons and Paul Stanley

References

Rock music groups from New York (state)
Musical groups established in 1968
Musical groups disestablished in 1971
1970 debut albums
Albums produced by Lewis Merenstein
MCA Records albums